Lilys are an American indie rock band formed in Washington, D.C in 1988. The only constant member is Kurt Heasley, with the line-up changing regularly. Several of the band's tracks have been used in television advertisements, including the band's biggest hit, "A Nanny In Manhattan", which reached No. 16 in the UK after being used in a Levi's advertisement directed by Roman Coppola.

Heasley collaborations and productions
Heasley has collaborated with other acts such as Nobody, appearing on the band's 2005 single "Fancy", a cover of the Kinks song, and The Brian Jonestown Massacre, singing "Tschuss" on their 2003 album And This Is Our Music.  He also contributed "effects" to Poole's "Snowcicle" on the band's Alaska Days album, and performed on Apples In Stereo's 1995 album Fun Trick Noisemaker, and Neko Case's 2009 album Middle Cyclone. He co-wrote the Twitch Hazel contributions to their 1997 split double-7-inch EP Kramer's Beach. 
He has also produced recordings by other artists including The Asteroid#4 (Apple Street: A Classic Tale Of Love And Hate, King Richard's Collectibles), The Ladybug Transistor, and Mazarin and co-engineered Echo Orbiter's Laughing All The While.

Musical style
The band's music has shifted style several times in its history. The early recordings, including debut album In The Presence of Nothing, were strongly influenced by My Bloody Valentine. They then moved through dream pop before settling on a new style that has been described as mod revival and a particularly strong influence from The Kinks, and other 1960s bands such as The Monkees and The Zombies leading to the 1996 album Better Can't Make Your Life Better, Later releases included elements of psychedelic rock and a return to their earlier shoegazing sound. The band have gained a reputation for sounding very similar to other artists and bands over the years, with Michael Sandlin of Pitchfork Media going as far as saying "You might say Lilys frontman Kurt Heasley is a world-class thief", but as one journalist put it "I know we're supposed to hate bands that sound too much like other bands, but the difference with the Lilys is that they do it so blatantly and so shamelessly that it's somehow rendered okay."

Robert Christgau described the band's sound as "amplified watercolors".

Discography

Albums
In the Presence of Nothing (1992), Slumberland
A Brief History of Amazing Letdowns (1994) (10" mini album), SpinART
Eccsame the Photon Band (1994), SpinART, reissued in (2015), Frontier Records
Better Can't Make Your Life Better (1996), Che/Primary
The 3 Way (1999), Sire
Zero Population Growth: Bliss Out Volume 15 (1999), Darla
Precollection (2003), Manifesto, reissued in Europe with 3 bonus tracks as The Lilys (2004), Rainbow Quartz
Everything Wrong Is Imaginary (2006), Manifesto

Singles/EPs 
 "February Fourteenth/Threw A Day" (1991), Slumberland
 "Tone Bender" (1993)
 Tone Bender EP (1994), Summershine - first 2 singles re-released as EP
 "Returns Every Morning" (1996), Ché
 "A Nanny in Manhattan" (1996), Ché
 Which Studies the Past? EP (1996), Sub Pop
 Services (For the Soon to Be Departed) EP (1997), Primary
 "A Nanny in Manhattan" (1998), Ché  (UK No. 16)
 Lilys/Aspera Ad Astra Split (2000), Tiger Style, split EP with Aspera Ad Astra
 Selected EP (2000), File 13
 Well Traveled Is Protest Lilys/Big Troubles Split 7" (2012), Speakertree Records

Compilation appearances
"Any Several Sundays" appears on ...One Last Kiss (CD) (1992), spinART Records
"Claire Hates Me" appears on Neapolitan Metropolitan (3 x 7-inch EP box set) (1992), Simple Machines
"Excelsior Plainslide" appears on Ten Cent Fix - A Jiffy Boy Records Compilation (1993), Jiffy Boy Records
"Strange Feelin'" appears on Sing A Song For You: Tribute To Tim Buckley (2000), Manifesto
"Dreams Never End" appears on "Slumberland Records - The First 20 Years" (2009), Slumberland Records

References

External links

Indie rock musical groups from Washington, D.C.
Musical groups established in 1988
Rocket Girl artists
Frontier Records artists
Sire Records artists
Elektra Records artists
SpinART Records artists
Low Transit Industries artists
Darla Records artists